In enzymology, a polynucleotide 5'-hydroxyl-kinase is an enzyme that catalyzes the chemical reaction

ATP + 5'-dephospho-DNA  ADP + 5'-phospho-DNA

Thus, the two substrates of this enzyme are ATP and 5'-dephospho-DNA, whereas its two products are ADP and 5'-phospho-DNA. Polynucleotide kinase is a T7 bacteriophage (or T4 bacteriophage) enzyme that catalyzes the transfer of a gamma-phosphate from ATP to the free hydroxyl end of the 5' DNA or RNA. The resulting product could be used to end-label DNA or RNA, or in ligation reactions.

Nomenclature 

This enzyme belongs to the family of transferases, specifically those transferring phosphorus-containing groups (phosphotransferases) with an alcohol group as an acceptor.  The systematic name of this enzyme class is ATP:5'-dephosphopolynucleotide 5'-phosphotransferase. Other names in common use include:
ATP:5'-dephosphopolynucleotide 5'-phosphatase
 PNK
 polynucleotide 5'-hydroxyl kinase (phosphorylating),
 5'-hydroxyl polynucleotide kinase,
 5'-hydroxyl polyribonucleotide kinase,
 5'-hydroxyl RNA kinase,
 DNA 5'-hydroxyl kinase,
 DNA kinase,
 polynucleotide kinase, and
 polynucleotide 5'-hydroxy-kinase.

References

External links
Vivo
 New England Biolabs' T4 PNK page

EC 2.7.1
Enzymes of known structure